The 1997 Detroit Tigers finished in third place in the American League Eastern Division with a record of 79-83 (.488), an improvement of 26 games over the previous season.  They were outscored by their opponents 790 to 784. The Tigers drew 1,365,157 fans to Tiger Stadium in 1997, ranking 13th of the 14 teams in the American League.

This was the Tigers' final year in the AL East. Beginning in 1998, the team joined the American League Central Division. On July 27, 1997, the Detroit Tigers retired pitcher Hal Newhouser's number 16.

Offseason
January 9, 1997: Vince Coleman signed as a free agent with the Detroit Tigers.

Regular season

Season standings

Record vs. opponents

Transactions
 April 8, 1997: Bob Hamelin was signed as a free agent with the Detroit Tigers.
April 16, 1997: Vince Coleman was released by the Detroit Tigers.

Roster

Game log

|- bgcolor="ffbbbb"
|- style="background: #ffdddd; text-align: center"
||1||April 1||at Minnesota Twins||7-5||Naulty||Miceli||Aguilera||43,216||0-1
|- style="background: #ffdddd; text-align: center"
|2||April 3||at Minnesota Twins||7-6|||Aguilera||Jones||||10,827||0-2
|- style="background: #ffdddd; text-align: center"
|3||April 3||at Minnesota Twins||10-6||Ritchie||Blair||Naulty||11,533||0-3
|- style="background: #ddffdd; text-align: center"
|4||April 4||at Boston Red Sox||8-7||Jones||Levine||Sager||38,560||1-3
|- style="background: #ddffdd; text-align: center"
|5||April 5||at Boston Red Sox||15-12||Blair||Castillo||Jones||21,956||2-3
|- style="background: #ffdddd; text-align: center"
|6||April 6||at Boston Red Sox||5-3||Navarro||Brocail||Hernandez||19,259||2-4
|- style="background: #ddffdd; text-align: center"
|7||April 7||Minnesota Twins||10-4||Thompson||Rodriguez||||42,749||3-4
|- style="background: #ddffdd; text-align: center"
|8||April 9||Minnesota Twins||10-5||Cummings||Ritchie||||6,477||4-4
|- style="background: #ffdddd; text-align: center"
|9||April 10||Minnesota Twins||7-3||Aldred||Blair||||6,381||4-5
|- style="background: #ddffdd; text-align: center"
|10||April 11||Boston Red Sox||5-4||Olivares||Drabek||Jones||7,598||5-5
|- style="background: #ffdddd; text-align: center"
|11||April 13||Boston Red Sox||11-8||Hernandez||Lira||||0||5-6
|- style="background: #ddffdd; text-align: center"
|12||April 13||Boston Red Sox||4-2||Sager||Hernandez||||10,818||6-6
|- style="background: #ffdddd; text-align: center"
|13||April 14||at Milwaukee Brewers||7-0||Eldred||Moehler||||6,079||6-7
|- style="background: #ddffdd; text-align: center"
|14||April 15||at Milwaukee Brewers||3-1||Blair||Karl||Jones||5,891||7-7
|- style="background: #ffdddd; text-align: center"
|15||April 16||Seattle Mariners||7-3||Johnson||Sager||||8,090||7-8
|- style="background: #ffdddd; text-align: center"
|16||April 17||Seattle Mariners||8-6||Fassero||Bautista||Charlton||8,973||7-9
|- style="background: #ffdddd; text-align: center"
|17||April 18||Oakland Athletics||9-5||Groom||Myers||||7,748||7-10
|- style="background: #ffdddd; text-align: center"
|18||April 19||Oakland Athletics||7-1||Adams||Thompson||||10,592||7-11
|- style="background: #ddffdd; text-align: center"
|19||April 20||Oakland Athletics||9-2||Moehler||Karsay||||9,281||8-11
|- style="background: #ddffdd; text-align: center"
|20||April 21||at Texas Rangers||7-6||Sager||Vosberg||Miceli||21,562||9-11
|- style="background: #ffdddd; text-align: center"
|21||April 23||at Texas Rangers||2-1||Wetteland||Brocail||||35,230||9-12
|- style="background: #ffdddd; text-align: center"
|22||April 24||at Texas Rangers||4-2||Pavlik||Thompson||Wetteland||31,902||9-13
|- style="background: #ffdddd; text-align: center"
|23||April 25||at Anaheim Angels||8-3||Dickson||Lira||||30,464||9-14
|- style="background: #ddffdd; text-align: center"
|24||April 26||at Anaheim Angels||2-0||Moehler||Finley||||30,872||10-14
|- style="background: #ffdddd; text-align: center"
|25||April 27||at Anaheim Angels||6-5|||James||Myers||||16,409||10-15
|- style="background: #ffdddd; text-align: center"
|26||April 29||Milwaukee Brewers||2-1||Eldred||Olivares||Jones||8,195||10-16
|- style="background: #ddffdd; text-align: center"
|27||April 30||Milwaukee Brewers||8-4||Thompson||Karl||||12,888||11-16
|-

|- bgcolor="ffbbbb"
|- style="background: #ffdddd; text-align: center"
|28||May 3||at Cleveland Indians||7-6||Plunk||Brocail||||42,469||11-17
|- style="background: #ddffdd; text-align: center"
|29||May 4||at Cleveland Indians||2-0||Blair||Nagy||Brocail||42,387||12-17
|- style="background: #ffdddd; text-align: center"
|30||May 5||at Toronto Blue Jays||3-1||Clemens||Olivares||||27,169||12-18
|- style="background: #ffdddd; text-align: center"
|31||May 6||at Toronto Blue Jays||2-1||Crabtree||Jones||||26,294||12-19
|- style="background: #ddffdd; text-align: center"
|32||May 7||Kansas City Royals||12-3||Lira||Pittsley||||7,949||13-19
|- style="background: #ffdddd; text-align: center"
|33||May 8||Kansas City Royals||4-0||Belcher||Moehler||||16,243||13-20
|- style="background: #ffdddd; text-align: center"
|34||May 9||Cleveland Indians||5-0||Nagy||Sager||||20,393||13-21
|- style="background: #ddffdd; text-align: center"
|35||May 10||Cleveland Indians||6-0||Olivares||Colon||||30,578||14-21
|- style="background: #ddffdd; text-align: center"
|36||May 11||Cleveland Indians||11-3||Thompson||Hershiser|||||19,869||15-21
|- style="background: #ddffdd; text-align: center"
|37||May 13||Toronto Blue Jays||4-0||Lira||Guzman||||9,992||16-21
|- style="background: #ffdddd; text-align: center"
|38||May 14||Toronto Blue Jays||7-2||Belcher||Moehler|||||11,788||16-22
|- style="background: #ffdddd; text-align: center"
|39||May 15||at Kansas City Royals||10-9||Nagy||Sager||||18,160||16-23
|- style="background: #ddffdd; text-align: center"
|40||May 16||at Kansas City Royals||10-2||Olivares||Colon||||17,787||17-23
|- style="background: #ddffdd; text-align: center"
|41||May 17||at Kansas City Royals||9-2||Thompson||Hershiser||||22,891||18-23
|- style="background: #ddffdd; text-align: center"
|42||May 18||at Kansas City Royals||6-5||Lira||Guzman||||15,333||19-23
|- style="background: #ffdddd; text-align: center"
|43||May 20||at Baltimore Orioles||4-3||Hentgen||Moehler||||48,003||19-24
|- style="background: #ffdddd; text-align: center"
|44||May 21||at Baltimore Orioles||2-0||Erickson||Thompson||Myers||47,877||19-25
|- style="background: #ddffdd; text-align: center"
|45||May 23||Texas Rangers||7-1||Moehler||Oliver||||16,017||20-25
|- style="background: #ffdddd; text-align: center"
|46||May 24||Texas Rangers||8-4|||Hill||Pugh||||10,797||20-26
|- style="background: #ddffdd; text-align: center"
|47||May 25||Texas Rangers||13-5||Lira||Witt||Sager||13,451||21-26
|- style="background: #ddffdd; text-align: center"
|48||May 26||Anaheim Angels||6-0||Olivares||Finley||||12,562||22-26
|- style="background: #ddffdd; text-align: center"
|49||May 27||Anaheim Angels||6-2||Thompson||Perisho||Myers||8,042||23-26
|- style="background: #ffdddd; text-align: center"
|50||May 28||Baltimore Orioles||8-1||Key||Moehler||Boskie||10,692||23-27
|- style="background: #ddffdd; text-align: center"
|51||May 30||at Seattle Mariners||5-2||Lira||Fassero||Jones||32,305||24-27
|- style="background: #ddffdd; text-align: center"
|52||May 31||at Seattle Mariners||4-2||Olivares||Wolcott||Jones||57,118||25-27
|-

|- bgcolor="ffbbbb"
|- style="background: #ffdddd; text-align: center"
|53||June 1||at Seattle Mariners||4-1||Sanders||Thompson||Ayala||39,841||25-28
|- style="background: #ddffdd; text-align: center"
|54||June 2||at Oakland Athletics||8-7||Moehler||Karsay||Brocail||6,480||26-28
|- style="background: #ffdddd; text-align: center"
|55||June 3||at Oakland Athletics||9-8||Small||Myers||Johnson||10,134||26-29
|- style="background: #ffdddd; text-align: center"
|56||June 5||Seattle Mariners||14-6||Fassero||Lira||||12,572||26-30
|- style="background: #ffdddd; text-align: center"
|57||June 6||Seattle Mariners||6-3||Lowe||Olivares||Ayala||25,547||26-31
|- style="background: #ddffdd; text-align: center"
|58||June 7||Seattle Mariners||3-1||Thompson||Wolcott||Jones||18,896||27-31
|- style="background: #ffdddd; text-align: center"
|59||June 8||Seattle Mariners|||2-0||Johnson||Moehler||Ayala||20,287||27-32
|- style="background: #ddffdd; text-align: center"
|60||June 10||Oakland Athletics||6-4||Blair||Prieto||Jones||10,019||28-32
|- style="background: #ddffdd; text-align: center"
|61||June 11||Oakland Athletics||4-2||Brocail||Small||Jones||11,534||29-32
|- style="background: #ffdddd; text-align: center"
|62||June 13||at Montreal Expos||4-3||Perez||Olivares||Urbina||20,333||29-33
|- style="background: #ffdddd; text-align: center"
|63||June 14||at Montreal Expos||1-0||Martinez||Thompson||||21,127||29-34
|- style="background: #ffdddd; text-align: center"
|64||June 15||at Montreal Expos||10-2||Juden||Moehler||||18,534||29-35
|- style="background: #ffdddd; text-align: center"
|65||June 16||Florida Marlins||7-3||Brown||Blair||||23,874||29-36
|- style="background: #ffdddd; text-align: center"
|66||June 17||Florida Marlins||3-2||Alfonseca||Jones||Nen||13,351||29-37
|- style="background: #ddffdd; text-align: center"
|67||June 18||Florida Marlins||6-2||Olivares||Leiter||||14,043||30-37
|- style="background: #ddffdd; text-align: center"
|68||June 20||Boston Red Sox||12-6||Thompson||Wakefield||Sager||20,091||31-37
|- style="background: #ddffdd; text-align: center"
|69||June 21||Boston Red Sox||15-4||Bautisa||Eshelman||||20,599||32-37
|- style="background: #ffdddd; text-align: center"
|70||June 22||Boston Red Sox||2-1||Gordon||Blair||Slocumb||19,477||32-38
|- style="background: #ffdddd; text-align: center"
|71||June 23||New York Yankees||5-2||Cone||Lira||Rivera|||14,556||32-39
|- style="background: #ffdddd; text-align: center"
|72||June 24||New York Yankees||12-9||Lloyd||Myers||Rivera||15,872||32-40
|- style="background: #ffdddd; text-align: center"
|73||June 25||New York Yankees||3-1||Stanton||Thompson||Rivera|||15,348||32-41
|- style="background: #ddffdd; text-align: center"
|74||June 26||at Boston Red Sox||10-6||Moehler||Eshelman||||31,878||33-41
|- style="background: #ddffdd; text-align: center"
|75||June 27||at Boston Red Sox||2-1||Miceli||Hammond||Jones||26,753||34-41
|- style="background: #ddffdd; text-align: center"
|76||June 28||at Boston Red Sox||9-2||Lira||Sele||||30,886||35-41
|- style="background: #ffdddd; text-align: center"
|77||June 29||at Boston Red Sox||8-6||Wasdin||Bautista||Slocumb||30,844||35-42
|- style="background: #ddffdd; text-align: center"
|78||June 30||New York Mets||14-0||Thompson||Clark||||15,009||36-42
|-

|- bgcolor="ffbbbb"
|- style="background: #ddffdd; text-align: center"
|79||July 1||New York Mets||8-6||Moehler||Jones||Jones||14,849||37-42
|- style="background: #ddffdd; text-align: center"
|80||July 2||New York Mets||9-7||Blair||Mlicki||Jones||16,211||38-42
|- style="background: #ffdddd; text-align: center"
|81||July 3||Baltimore Orioles||10-1||Key||Lira||||13,209||38-43
|- style="background: #ffdddd; text-align: center"
|82||July 4||Baltimore Orioles||4-3||Rhodes||Keagle||Myers||0||38-44
|- style="background: #ddffdd; text-align: center"
|83||July 4||Baltimore Orioles||11-8||Bautista||Mills||Jones|||30,100||39-44
|- style="background: #ddffdd; text-align: center"
|84||July 5||Baltimore Orioles||6-5||Miceli||Orosco||Jones||37,074||40-44
|- style="background: #ddffdd; text-align: center"
|85||July 6||Baltimore Orioles||14-9||Blair||Erickson||||18,197||41-44
|- style="background: #ffdddd; text-align: center"
|86||July 10||at New York Yankees||10-3||Irabu||Olivares||||51,901||41-45
|- style="background: #ffdddd; text-align: center"
|87||July 11||at New York Yankees||3-0||Pettite||Moehler||Rivera||27,135||41-46
|- style="background: #ffdddd; text-align: center"
|88||July 12||at New York Yankees||6-2||Cone||Lira||Rivera||39,681||41-47
|- style="background: #ddffdd; text-align: center"
|89||July 13||at New York Yankees||3-1||Blair||Gooden||Jones||36,679||42-47
|- style="background: #ffdddd; text-align: center"
|90||July 14||at Boston Red Sox||18-4||Suppan||Jarvis|||||21,997||42-48
|- style="background: #ddffdd; text-align: center"
|91||July 15||at Boston Red Sox||7-5||Jones||Wasdin||||25,822||43-48
|- style="background: #ffdddd; text-align: center"
|92||July 16||at Anaheim Angels||5-3||Finley||Moehler||Percival||16,570||43-49
|- style="background: #ffdddd; text-align: center"
|93||July 17||at Anaheim Angels||9-4||Springer||Lira||||19,246||43-50
|- style="background: #ddffdd; text-align: center"
|94||July 18||at Texas Rangers||5-4||Blair||Witt||Jones||35,074||44-50
|- style="background: #ddffdd; text-align: center"
|95||July 19||at Texas Rangers||6-5||Brocail||Hernandez||Jones||45,025||45-50
|- style="background: #ffdddd; text-align: center"
|96||July 20||at Texas Rangers||7-6||Wetteland||Sager||||33,655||45-51
|- style="background: #ffdddd; text-align: center"
|97||July 21||Boston Red Sox||3-0||Alvarez||Thompson||Hernandez||14,260||45-52
|- style="background: #ddffdd; text-align: center"
|98||July 22||Boston Red Sox||6-3||Moehler||Darwin||Jones||16,895||46-52
|- style="background: #ddffdd; text-align: center"
|99||July 23||Boston Red Sox||8-6||Blair||Baldwin||Jones||18,525||47-52
|- style="background: #ffdddd; text-align: center"
|100||July 25||Milwaukee Brewers||6-1||Karl||Sanders||||22,532||47-53
|- style="background: #ffdddd; text-align: center"
|101||July 26||Milwaukee Brewers||3-1||Florie||Thompson||Fetters||20,057||47-54
|- style="background: #ffdddd; text-align: center"
|102||July 27||Milwaukee Brewers||11-7||Eldred||Moehler||Reyes||20,318||47-55
|- style="background: #ddffdd; text-align: center"
|103||July 29||at Boston Red Sox||3-1||Blair||Baldwin||||20,380||48-55
|- style="background: #ffdddd; text-align: center"
|104||July 30||at Boston Red Sox||3-2||Drabek||Sanders||Hernandez||30,613||48-56
|- style="background: #ddffdd; text-align: center"
|105||July 31||Toronto Blue Jays||4-2||Thompson||Person||Jones||16,294||49-56
|-

|- bgcolor="ffbbbb"
|- style="background: #ffdddd; text-align: center"
|106||August 1||Toronto Blue Jays||7-5||Hentgen||Miceli||Ecobar||23,682||49-57
|- style="background: #ddffdd; text-align: center"
|107||August 2||Toronto Blue Jays||8-7||Brocail||Quantrill||Jones||22,254||50-57
|- style="background: #ddffdd; text-align: center"
|108||August 3||Toronto Blue Jays||5-2||Blair||Williams||Jones||27,848||51-57
|- style="background: #ffdddd; text-align: center"
|109||August 4||Cleveland Indians||7-2||Nagy||Sanders||||26,832||51-58
|- style="background: #ddffdd; text-align: center"
|110||August 5||Cleveland Indians||6-4||Thompson||Plunk||Jones||24,824||52-58
|- style="background: #ffdddd; text-align: center"
|111||August 6||at Kansas City Royals||5-4||Rosado||Sager||Montgomery||14,640||52-59
|- style="background: #ddffdd; text-align: center"
|112||August 7||at Kansas City Royals||8-4||Dishman||Belcher||||21,497||53-59
|- style="background: #ffdddd; text-align: center"
|113||August 8||at Toronto Blue Jays||6-3||Williams||Blair||Escobar||30,228||53-60
|- style="background: #ddffdd; text-align: center"
|114||August 9||at Toronto Blue Jays||3-2||Sanders||Carpenter||Jones||37,166||54-60
|- style="background: #ddffdd; text-align: center"
|115||August 10||at Toronto Blue Jays||4-2||Thompson||Person||||32,354||55-60
|- style="background: #ffdddd; text-align: center"
|116||August 11||at Toronto Blue Jays||8-2||Hentgen||Jarvis||||30,105||55-61
|- style="background: #ffdddd; text-align: center"
|117||August 12||at Cleveland Indians||7-4||Plunk||Keagle||Mesa||32,992||55-62
|- style="background: #ddffdd; text-align: center"
|118||August 13||at Cleveland Indians||13-3||Blair||Smiley||||0||56-62
|- style="background: #ffdddd; text-align: center"
|119||August 13||at Cleveland Indians||9-1||Hershiser||Dishman||||42,673||56-63
|- style="background: #ffdddd; text-align: center"
|120||August 14||at Cleveland Indians||12-1||Nagy||Sanders||||42,936||56-64
|- style="background: #ffdddd; text-align: center"
|121||August 15||Kansas City Royals||5-3||Rusch||Thompson||Montgomery||20,099||56-65
|- style="background: #ffdddd; text-align: center"
|122||August 16||Kansas City Royals||2-1||Appier||Jarvis||Montgomery|||15,502||56-66
|- style="background: #ddffdd; text-align: center"
|123||August 17||Kansas City Royals||8-4||Keagle||Rosado||||22,371||57-66
|- style="background: #ddffdd; text-align: center"
|124||August 19||Minnesota Twins||8-2||Blair||Hawkins||||15,478||58-66
|- style="background: #ffdddd; text-align: center"
|125||August 20||Minnesota Twins||11-1||Radke||Sanders||||13,199||58-67
|- style="background: #ddffdd; text-align: center"
|126||August 21||at Milwaukee Brewers||2-1||Miceli||Wickman||Jones||18,117||59-67
|- style="background: #ddffdd; text-align: center"
|127||August 22||at Milwaukee Brewers||16-1||Moehler||Woodard||Gaillard||14,423||60-67
|- style="background: #ffdddd; text-align: center"
|128||August 23||at Milwaukee Brewers||5-2||Karl||Keagle||Jones||19,524||60-68
|- style="background: #ffdddd; text-align: center"
|129||August 24||at Milwaukee Brewers||6-0||Mercedes||Blair||||21,245||60-69
|- style="background: #ddffdd; text-align: center"
|130||August 25||at Minnesota Twins||7-6||Sager||Aguilera||||15,245||61-69
|- style="background: #ffdddd; text-align: center"
|131||August 26||at Minnesota Twins||8-2||Robertson||Thompson||Trombley||10,562||61-70
|- style="background: #ffdddd; text-align: center"
|132||August 27||at Minnesota Twins||2-0||Tewksberry||Moehler||||10,441||61-71
|- style="background: #ddffdd; text-align: center"
|133||August 29||Philadelphia Phillies||7-2||Blair||Green||||22,925||62-71
|- style="background: #ffdddd; text-align: center"
|134||August 30||Philadelphia Phillies||2-0||Beech||Sanders||Bottalico||22,537||62-72
|- style="background: #ddffdd; text-align: center"
|135||August 31||Philadelphia Phillies||2-1||Thompson||Leiter||Jones||19,152||63-72
|-

|- bgcolor="ffbbbb"
|- style="background: #ffdddd; text-align: center"
|136||September 1||at Atlanta Braves||4-2||Moehler||Maddux||Jones||38,950||64-72
|- style="background: #ffdddd; text-align: center"
|137||September 2||at Atlanta Braves||5-0||Neagle||Keagle||||32,308||64-73
|- style="background: #ddffdd; text-align: center"
|138||September 3||at Atlanta Braves||12-4||Blair||Smoltz||||36,556||65-73
|- style="background: #ddffdd; text-align: center"
|139||September 4||Anaheim Angels||5-4||Jones||Harris||||9,445||66-73
|- style="background: #ddffdd; text-align: center"
|140||September 5||Anaheim Angels||6-1||Thompson||Springer||||16,016||67-73
|- style="background: #ddffdd; text-align: center"
|141||September 6||Anaheim Angels||7-5||Moehler||Watson||Jones||16,294||68-73
|- style="background: #ffdddd; text-align: center"
|142||September 7||Anaheim Angels||5-4||Hasegawa||Dishman||||25,602||68-74
|- style="background: #ddffdd; text-align: center"
|143||September 8||Texas Rangers||6-2||Blair||Witt||||15,765||69-74
|- style="background: #ddffdd; text-align: center"
|144||September 9||Texas Rangers||4-0||Sanders||Helling||||9,139||70-74
|- style="background: #ffdddd; text-align: center"
|145||September 10||at Seattle Mariners||10-0||Moyer||Thompson||||22,967||70-75
|- style="background: #ddffdd; text-align: center"
|146||September 11||at Seattle Mariners||3-1||Moehler||Fassero||Jones||25,141||71-75
|- style="background: #ddffdd; text-align: center"
|147||September 12||at Oakland Athletics||7-2||Keagler||Ludwick||Miceli||11,775||72-75
|- style="background: #ffdddd; text-align: center"
|148||September 13||at Oakland Athletics||4-2||Telgheder||Blair||Mathews||20,482||72-76
|- style="background: #ddffdd; text-align: center"
|149||September 14||at Oakland Athletics||6-5||Sanders||Haynes||Jones||16,440||73-76
|- style="background: #ddffdd; text-align: center"
|150||September 15||at Oakland Athletics||6-3||Thompson||Oquist||Jones||4,651||74-76
|- style="background: #ffdddd; text-align: center"
|151||September 17||at New York Yankees||6-2||Mendoza||Moehler||||19,331||74-77
|- style="background: #ddffdd; text-align: center"
|152||September 18||at New York Yankees||9-7||Jones||Borowsku||Miceli||18,600||75-77
|- style="background: #ddffdd; text-align: center"
|153||September 19||at Baltimore Orioles||5-3||Jones||Mills||||47,544||76-77
|- style="background: #ffdddd; text-align: center"
|154||September 20||at Baltimore Orioles||12-8||Rodriquez||Sanders||||47,489||76-78
|- style="background: #ddffdd; text-align: center"
|155||September 21||at Baltimore Orioles||11-3||Thompson||Key||||47,446||77-78
|- style="background: #ddffdd; text-align: center"
|156||September 22||at Baltimore Orioles||5-4||Gaillard||Benitez||Jones||46,616||78-78
|- style="background: #ddffdd; text-align: center"
|157||September 23||Boston Red Sox||6-0||Keagle||Suppan||||43,039||79-78
|- style="background: #ffdddd; text-align: center"
|158||September 24||Boston Red Sox||9-2||Wakefield||Blair||||10,067||79-79
|- style="background: #ffdddd; text-align: center"
|159||September 25||Boston Red Sox||3-1||Checo||Sanders||Gordon||14,495||79-80
|- style="background: #ffdddd; text-align: center"
|160||September 26||New York Yankees||8-2||Rivera||Jones||||29,206||79-81
|- style="background: #ffdddd; text-align: center"
|161||September 27||New York Yankees||6-1||Wells||Moehler||||33,712||79-82
|- style="background: #ffdddd; text-align: center"
|162||September 28||New York Yankees||7-2||Irabu||Keagle||||38,171||79-83
|-

Player stats

Batting

Starters by position 
Note: Pos = Position; G = Games played; AB = At bats; H = Hits; Avg. = Batting average; HR = Home runs; RBI = Runs batted in

Other batters 
Note: G = Games played; AB = At bats; H = Hits; Avg. = Batting average; HR = Home runs; RBI = Runs batted in

Pitching

Starting pitchers 
Note: G = Games pitched; IP = Innings pitched; W = Wins; L = Losses; ERA = Earned run average; SO = Strikeouts

Other pitchers 
Note: G = Games pitched; IP = Innings pitched; W = Wins; L = Losses; ERA = Earned run average; SO = Strikeouts

Relief pitchers 
Note: G = Games pitched; IP = Innings pitched; W = Wins; L = Losses; SV = Saves; ERA = Earned run average; SO = Strikeouts

Farm system

References

External links

1997 Detroit Tigers season at  Baseball Reference

Detroit Tigers seasons
Detroit Tigers
Detroit
1997 in Detroit